The 2017–18 season of the Ukrainian Championship Higher League is the 27th season of Ukraine's top women's football league. The season has shifted from spring-fall season to fall-spring. It ran from 18 August 2017 to 27 May 2018.

Teams

Team changes

Stadiums
{| class="wikitable sortable"
|-
! Team
! Home city
! Home ground
! Capacity
|-
| data-sort-value="Iatran" | Iatran || Uman Raion || Tsentralnyi Raionyi Stadion || 1,600
|-
| data-sort-value="Iednist" | Iednist || Plysky || Iednist Stadion || 1,500
|-
| data-sort-value="Ladomyr" | Ladomyr || Volodymyr-Volynskyi || Olimp Stadion || 2,000+<ref>Volodymyr Krupchuk, Sofia Tkachuk. Provincial stadiums of Ukraine: "Olimp" in the Duchy's capital (Провінційні стадіони України: "Олімп" у столиці князівства). Depo Sector. 26 June 2016</ref>
|-
| data-sort-value="Lviv" | Ateks SDIuShOR-16 || VyshneveKyiv || Munitsypalnyi StadionStadion of the School 231KNUTE Stadion || 
|-
| data-sort-value="Pantery" | Pantery || Uman || Stadion Umanfermmash || 
|-
| data-sort-value="Dnipro-1" | Zlahoda-Dnipro-1 || Dnipro || Stadion Trudovi RezervyMolodizhnyi Stadion || 
|-
| data-sort-value="Rodyna" | Rodyna || MlynivKostopil || Stadion KolosStadion Kolos || 
|-
| data-sort-value="Voskhod" | Lehenda-ShVSM || Chernihiv || Stadion Tekstylschyk || 3,000
|-
| data-sort-value="Zhytlobud-1" | Zhytlobud-1 || Liubotyn || Stadion Olimpiyets || 
|-
| data-sort-value="Zhytlobud-2" | Zhytlobud-2 || Kharkiv || Sonyachny Stadium || 4,924
|}

League table

Results

Top scorers

Persha Liha
Group 1

Group 2

Group 3

Play-offs
SemifinalsVoskhod Velyka Bahachka and Iantarochka Novoyavorivsk gained promotion to the Ukrainian Women's League. Later Iantarochka yielded its place to WFC Lviv.Third place

FinalVoskhod Velyka Bahachka was crown as the champions of the 2017–18 Persha Liha.''

References

External links
WFPL.ua
Women's Football.ua

2017–18
2017–18 in Ukrainian association football leagues